Villivakkam is a neighbourhood of Chennai, Tamil Nadu, India. It is served by the Villivakkam railway station on the Chennai Central–Arakkonam suburban section.  Villivakkam is the largest state assembly constituency in Tamil Nadu in terms of number of voters.

Etymology
The real name of Villivakkam is Vilvaaranyam. An old Shiva temple here is built by Sage Agasthiyar and there are many vilvam (bael) trees here, hence it earned the name Vilva Aaranyam, which means the "jungle of bael trees". As time passed, the name changed into Villivakkam.

Transport

Road
Villivakkam has a bus terminus which is located off Konnur High Road. Jawaharlal Nehru Road and Konnur High Road are the arterial roads encompassing Villivakkam. The construction of the long pending Villivakkam Subway was started on 4 December 2007 and was inaugurated on 19 June 2012. The 447.50-m-long subway built at a cost of  390 million, would also have a bicycle lane of 2.5 m width.

Rail
Chennai suburban railway station at Villivakkam is between the segment of Chennai Central and Arakkonam Junction, and 10 km from Central, there are suburban services to Chennai Central, Chennai Beach, Velachery, Ambattur, Avadi, Pattabiram, Tiruvallur, Arakkonam and Ponneri. The link from Chennai to Arakkonam junction is the oldest railway line in South India.

Politics
Villivakkam is the largest state assembly constituency in Tamil Nadu in terms of number of voters. The Villivakkam constituency covers an area from Annanagar in south to Madavaram in north and from Ayanavaram in east to Korattur in west.

Education

Schools
 Singaram Pillay Higher Secondary School
 Shri Krishnaswamy Matriculation Higher Secondary School
 Padma Sarangapani Matriculation School
 Padma Sarangapani Junior School
 Our Lady of Velankanni Matriculation Higher Secondary School
 Singaram Pillai Girls' Higher Secondary School
 St. John's Matriculation Higher Secondary School
 Government Girls Higher secondary School
 Kanakadurga Telugu Higher Secondary School
 John Williams Matriculation School
 Almonds Play School
 Kids International Playschool & Preschool
 KRM Public School
 Bharatha Vidhyalaya Matric School

Entertainment

Cinema Theaters
 AGS Cinemas
 Nathamuni Cinemas
 Ganga Cinemas

Health Care
 Cauvery Trust Hospital
 Faith Multispeciality Hospital
 Niranjana Hospital and Well Women Centre
 Life care DKJ Hospital
 WCF Hospital
 RK Hospital
 M.R.H 24 Hours Medical Health Care
 Sree Krishna ENT Care
Swamy Eye Clinic
Vigneshwara Eye Clinic
PK Dental Care
A.S.K. Dental Clinic

Religious Places 
Temples:
 Sri Sowmia Damodara Perumal Devasthanam
 Sri Anjaneyar Swamy Temple
 Arulmigu Sri Agatheeswarar Temple
 Arulmigu Sri Ayyappa Temple
 Shirdi Sai Baba Temple
 Sri Devi Angalaparameshwari Amman Temple
 Kalyana Subramania Swamy Temple
 Karumari Amman Temple
 Varasakthi Vinayagar Temple
 Elangaliamman Temple
 Shri Kamatchi Amman Temple
 Sri Baliamman Temple

Mosques:
 Masjid-E Rahmaniah
 Masjid-e-Noor
 Anjuman E Mohammedi Masjid
 Masjid-e-Maqthab Nooriyah

Churches:
 Peniel Evangelical Church
 Blessing Centre AG Church
 Velankanni Madha Church
 E.C.I. Villivakkam Church
 Chennai Telugu Baptist Church
 St Stephens Church
 Philadelphia Fellowship Church
 Evangelical Church Of India E.C.I Villivakkam Church
 T.E.L.C Arputhanathar Church
 Shekinah Abundant Life church

Grocery Market 
Villivakkam market is one of the famous market around the neighborhood of Villivakkam which located near Villivakkam Railway Station. The market is running from the British period with the expansion of over 12000 sq.ft. It is one of the oldest markets in Chennai.

Local Newsletters 
In Villivakkam, a weekly local newsletter named "Villivakkam Times" is issued.

References

External links

ICF

Neighbourhoods in Chennai